Bohtan (also Buhtan, Bokhti) was a medieval Kurdish principality in the Ottoman Empire centered on the town of Jazirah ibn 'Omar (modern Cizre also known as Cizîra Botan (Jazira Botan) in southeastern Anatolia. Bohtanis were an ancient and prominent branch of the Kurds that claimed descent from the Islamic General and Sahaba Khalid ibn al-Walid. The official religion of this principality was Yezidism in 14th century, although the rulers eventually converted to Islam, Bohtan still constituted the third major Yezidi enclave after Shekhan and Sinjar until 19th century.

History
In the early 8th century, Bukhtis and Bajnawi Kurds ruled the area surrounding Sinjar and Jazira mountains known under name Zozan by Arab geographers. Yaqoot Hamawi describes their residing area to be from Ikhlat to Salmas which included many strongholds belonging to Bokhtis; he also mentioned town of Jardhakil as their capital. The principality ruled over an area extending from Diyarbakir to Van and from Rawanduz to Sinjar at its peak. The first governors of Bohtan, were from the Azizan family, who originally followed Yezidism later converted to Sunni Islam and were related to the Governors of the Principality of Bitlis. Following their role in the Ottoman defeat of the Safavids in the Battle of Caldiran in 1514, Bohtan was granted the status of a Hükümet, and it became a hereditary Kurdish principality within the Ottoman Empire.

An important governor of the Bohtan was Bedir Khan Bey, who succeeded Mir Seyfeddin. Bedir Khan Bey was Mîr of the principality between 1821 and 1847. He reformed the military forces in establishing an elite force consistent with members of the several tribes within the emirate which brought security into Bohtan. According to European diplomats in the region, he even tested if the regional chief was observant enough. He would try to raid a tribe by night, and if he succeeded he would punish the tribal chief in whose territory the robbery was successful. He then returned what he had robbed the night before. The security standard in Bohtan was such, that it encouraged the population of neighboring provinces to move into the territory under Bedir Khans control. This led to the opposition by the Ottoman Vali of Mosul, who demanded an end to the emigration of the habitants from the Mosul province to Bohtan. Following, Bedir Khan expelled 2000 immigrants who settled into Bohtan during the Governorship of Mehmet Pasha in Mosul, but they returned after four years. The renewed emigration lead the Vali of Mosul Mehmet Şerif Pasha to file a report against Bedir Khan, who in 1847 had to agree to bring an end to the immigration of foreigners in Bohtan.    
Bedir Khan Bey resigned after an unsuccessful uprising against the Ottoman Empire and following, Bohtan lost its independence

See also
 List of Kurdish dynasties and countries

References

External links
Encyclopaedia Islamica (in Persian)

Former Kurdish states in Turkey
Kurdish dynasties
History of Şırnak Province
Vassal states of the Ottoman Empire
Yazidi history